William Samuel Ritchie (February 25, 1927 – February 7, 2014) was a Canadian businessman entrepreneur and politician. He served in the Legislative Assembly of British Columbia from 1979 to 1986, as a Social Credit member for the constituency of Central Fraser Valley.

Biography

During World War II, Ritchie lied about his age and joined the British Royal Navy. He sold kindling door-to-door, giving his mother most of his earnings to help with family expenses. Ritchie farmed in Scotland and eventually moved to County Fermanagh, Northern Ireland where he married Maud Armstrong and had their first child.

In 1952, Ritchie left aboard the ship Empress of Canada and settled in Winnipeg there they had their second child. He held numerous jobs all in agriculture except for a short time at Trans Canada Airlines and as a real estate agent.  His career took him back and forth between Manitoba and British Columbia.

Eventually, Ritchie moved to Burnaby British Columbia there they had their third and fourth child and earning the position of General Sales Manager At Buckerfields Feed, he eventually moved to Abbotsford British Columbia and partnered with Dave Smith and formed "Ritchie-Smith Feeds Ltd."

Political career

After selling Ritchie-Smith Feeds, he entered politics and become the MLA for Central Fraser Valley.  He served in the Bill Bennett government as Minister of Municipal Affairs.  In 1986, he did not seek re-election.

Later life and death

He met and married, Nina in 1990. Eventually, they settled in Qualicum Beach where they resided until he died.

References

1927 births
2014 deaths
British Columbia Social Credit Party MLAs
Businesspeople in agriculture
Canadian real estate agents
Farmers from British Columbia
Members of the Executive Council of British Columbia
People from Abbotsford, British Columbia
Politicians from Glasgow
Royal Navy personnel of World War II
Scottish emigrants to Canada
20th-century Canadian politicians